Helena Palaiologina (23 April 1442 –  1469), known also as Helena Hatun, was the daughter and only child of Demetrios Palaiologos, Despot of Morea, a brother of the final Byzantine emperor Constantine XI Palaiologos. Her mother was Theodora Asanina of the Asen family, a family which had once ruled Bulgaria. Famous for her beauty, Sultan Mehmed II, who had conquered Constantinople in 1453, planned to take her into his harem after his conquest of the Morea in 1460, but soon decided against it, despite securing Helena and her family, possibly due to fear of being poisoned by her.

Instead of entering the sultan's harem, Helena received a pension and large estate at Adrianople, where she lived until her death of unknown causes  1469, only about 27 years old.

Biography 
Helena Palaiologina, born 23 April 1442, was the daughter and only child of Demetrios Palaiologos, Despot of the Morea, a brother of Constantine XI Palaiologos, the final Byzantine emperor. Her mother was Theodora Asanina, the daughter of Paul Asan, part of the ancient Asen family, which had once ruled the Second Bulgarian Empire. At the time of Helena's birth, Demetrios was the Despot of Mesembria, not being appointed as the Despot of the Morea until 1449. In her time, Helena was famous for being beautiful and high-spirited.

In 1455, two years after the Fall of Constantinople, Helena's father Demetrios attempted to arrange a marriage alliance with Aragon and Naples by betrothing Helena, then 13 years old, to a grandson of King Alfonso the Magnanimous. After Sultan Mehmed II, who had conquered Constantinople in 1453 and now ruled as the suzerain of Demetrios and his co-despot and younger brother Thomas, invaded the Morea in 1458 because he had not received the agreed upon tribute by the two despots, these marriage plans fell through. In Alfonso's stead, Mehmed proclaimed that he would marry Helena.

From 1459 to 1460, Demetrios and Thomas fought a civil war over control of the Morea, which ended only with the intervention of Mehmed II and the annexation of both their territories into the Ottoman Empire. Whereas Thomas escaped into exile, Demetrios surrendered to the Ottomans at Mystras without a fight. Since he feared the sultan's retribution, Helena and her mother Theodore had already been sent to safety in Monemvasia. On 31 May, Mehmed II arrived outside Mystras and met with the frightened Demetrios, demanding Demetrios to recall Theodora and Helena from Monemvasia and yield them to the sultan so that they could accompany him to Adrianople. The sultan probably, at least initially, intended for Helena, now 18 years old, to enter his harem, and put her and her mother in the care of some of the eunuchs in his entourage. As per Byzantine historian Theodore Spandounes, Mehmed never married Helena:The reason for Helena never entering the sultan's harem is unknown, but it is possible that Mehmed II feared that the girl might attempt to poison him. Instead, Helena was provided with a pension and large estate at Adrianople by the sultan, though she was forbidden to marry. She died of unknown causes  1469, only about 27 years old, and both of her parents, so struck by grief that they retired to monastic life, died in the following year.

References

Cited bibliography

Cited web sources 

 

1442 births
1469 deaths
15th-century Byzantine people
Helena
15th-century Byzantine women